Kauchuk is a rural locality (a railway station) in Tchaikovsky, Perm Krai, Russia. The population was 186 as of 2010.

References 

Rural localities in Chaykovsky urban okrug